Down Where the Buffalo Go is a 1988 film made for television by BBC Scotland for The Play on One. It stars Harvey Keitel. It was written by Peter McDougall and directed by Ian Knox.

Synopsis
Carl is a US Navy Shore patrol officer (played by Keitel) who is based at the Holy Loch naval base in Scotland. Armed only with a nightstick, his primary function is to ensure that sailors on shore leave do not become too rowdy, and to provide help to sailors in need of assistance. Carl is married to a local girl and their relationship is at breaking point - she wants to leave Scotland and settle in America while he wants to remain in Scotland. With his brother-in-law Willie, who is already estranged from his wife and under threat of redundancy from his shipyard job, the two men forge a friendship to help each other through.

Set around the Holy Loch US Navy base, the film was made in the towns of Dunoon and Greenock.

References

External links
 

1980 films
British television films
Films shot in Argyll and Bute
1980s English-language films